Sherrell is the name of:

Carl Sherrell (1929–1990), American artist, illustrator, and author
Sweet Charles Sherrell (born 1943), American bassist
Horace Sherrell (1886–1940), American college football and coach
Sherell Ford (born 1972), American basketballer